"You" is a song by Georgian singer Tornike Kipiani. The song represented Georgia in the Eurovision Song Contest 2021 in Rotterdam, the Netherlands.

Eurovision Song Contest

Internal selection 
On 26 January 2021, GPB confirmed that Tornike Kipiani would represent Georgia in the 2021 contest.

In Eurovision 
The 65th edition of the Eurovision Song Contest took place in Rotterdam, the Netherlands and consisted of two semi-finals on 18 May and 20 May 2021, and the grand final on 22 May 2021. On 17 November 2020, it was announced that Georgia would be performing in the second half of the second semi-final of the contest.

References 

2021 songs
2021 singles
Eurovision songs of 2021
Eurovision songs of Georgia (country)
Tornike Kipiani songs